Thurnam may refer to:

People 

Peter Thurnham (1938–2008), British politician
Stephen Thurnham (died 1214), British justice and administrator

Places 

Thurnham, Kent, a village and parish in Kent, England
Thurnham Castle
Thurnham, Lancashire